The Rock of Monaco also known as  is a   tall monolith on the Mediterranean coast of the Principality of Monaco. It overlooks the Mediterranean Sea and the Port Hercules.

History
The Rock has been a coveted possession from the beginning of the ancient Massilian colony of Monoïkos (Greek: Μόνοικος), named for the Ligurian tribes who occupied the area and vied for control of it; even earlier, it was a shelter for primitive populations. The Rock of Monaco was also the first conquest of the Grimaldi dynasty, the rulers of the country for more than 700 years, founded when the Guelf Francesco Grimaldi disguised himself as a Franciscan friar in order to gain entry to the city and open the gates for his soldiers.

Today
Today, the Rock is in the oldest of Monaco's four quarters, Monaco-Ville, which is also the location of Old Town, the oldest part of the city, not far from the Prince's Palace, home of the current monarch Albert II and the princely family, the Cathedral and the Oceanographic Museum of Monaco. The Rock of Monaco is a popular attraction where tourists view the palace and the changing of the guards.

Image gallery

References

Geography of Monaco
Monaco
Mountains of Monaco